Miguel Ángel 'Periko' Alonso Oyarbide (born 1 February 1953) is a Spanish former football midfielder and manager.

In his professional career he played mainly for Real Sociedad (five years) and Barcelona (three), amassing La Liga totals of 273 matches and 42 goals during ten seasons.

A Spanish international for two years, Alonso represented the country at the 1982 World Cup.

Playing career
Born in Tolosa, Gipuzkoa, Alonso played professionally for Real Sociedad, FC Barcelona and CE Sabadell FC. With the first, he was instrumental in back-to-back La Liga conquests (averaging 32 games and five goals in those seasons and not starting only once), and won 19 of his 20 caps for Spain in the process; his debut came on 24 September 1980 in a friendly match with Hungary (2–2), in Budapest.

In 1982–83, having retired from the national team after the unsuccessful home World Cup campaign, Alonso joined Barcelona, being used relatively little during most of his spell. He won the league in his final year but only appeared twice, eventually retiring in 1988 with Barça neighbours Sabadell, helping the club achieve promotion from Segunda División in his first season and scoring 12 goals – a career-best – in his second, as the modest Catalans ranked 17th after the first 34 matches, but eventually managed to avoid a drop after finishing third in their relegation group in the second stage.

International goals

Coaching career
Alonso started working as a manager immediately after retiring, mainly in the Basque Country. In 2000, after an unsuccessful spell at Hércules CF (second division, relegation), he had a chance to coach Real Sociedad but only lasted ten games, after which he retired.

Personal life
Alonso's sons, Mikel and Xabi, were also footballers and midfielders. Both followed in their father's footsteps representing Real Sociedad, and the latter also played with great success for Liverpool, Real Madrid, FC Bayern Munich and the Spain national team.

Honours
Real Sociedad
La Liga: 1980–81, 1981–82

Barcelona
La Liga: 1984–85
Copa del Rey: 1982–83
Supercopa de España: 1983
Copa de la Liga: 1983

References

External links
Real Sociedad official profile

1953 births
Living people
People from Tolosa, Spain
Spanish footballers
Footballers from the Basque Country (autonomous community)
Association football midfielders
La Liga players
Segunda División players
Tercera División players
Real Sociedad B footballers
Real Sociedad footballers
FC Barcelona players
CE Sabadell FC footballers
Spain B international footballers
Spain international footballers
1982 FIFA World Cup players
Basque Country international footballers
Spanish football managers
La Liga managers
Segunda División managers
Segunda División B managers
Tolosa CF managers
Real Sociedad B managers
SD Eibar managers
Hércules CF managers
Real Sociedad managers
Alonso family (Gipuzkoa)